Anne Igartiburu Verdes (born 18 February 1969 in Elorrio, Biscay, Spain) is a Spanish Basque television presenter and actress.

Biography 
She studied Industrial Marketing. She started working in the local television of Mondragón in 1993. She then worked in Euskal Telebista, and later in Telecinco, hosting Una pareja feliz alongside Antonio Hidalgo in the 1994–95 season.

Since 1997, Igartiburu has presented daily celebrity news programme Corazón on Televisión Española, except for a period in 2012–13 when she presented daily infotainment show +Gente. From 2005 to 2009 she hosted the Spanish adaptation of Dancing with the Stars (¡Mira quién baila!). In 2006 she hosted the special show Gala 50 años de TVE, which celebrated the 50th anniversary of TVE, alongside Laura Valenzuela and Paula Vázquez.

Since 2005, Igartiburu has presented the annual New Year's Eve celebration broadcast for TVE live from Madrid's Puerta del Sol. Igartiburu has also been associated with the Eurovision Song Contest: she was the Spanish spokesperson in the 2002, 2003 and 2004 contests, and she hosted the Spanish national final in 2010, 2011, 2012, 2014, and 2016.

Personal life 
She was married to ballet dancer Igor Yebra from 2004 to 2006. Igartiburu has two adopted daughters, Noa (born 2000 in India) and Carmen (born 2011 in Vietnam). In 2015, she married conductor Pablo Heras-Casado. On 13 June 2016 she gave birth to their first baby son, Nicolás.

Filmography

Television

Film

Awards 
 Antena de Oro (2005)

References

External links 

 

1969 births
Living people
People from Durangaldea
Spanish film actresses
Spanish television actresses
Spanish television presenters
Actresses from the Basque Country (autonomous community)
Spanish women television presenters
20th-century Spanish actresses
21st-century Spanish actresses